Skylab IV is the fourth studio album by the Brazilian musician Rogério Skylab, the fourth in his series of ten eponymous, numbered albums. Self-released in 2003, it was the musician's first album to be recorded live without an audience – a trend which would continue for his subsequent studio releases. A music video for the track "Parafuso na Cabeça" came out in the same year, also the first-ever music video of his career; it was directed by Gustavo Caldas. The boy depicted in the album's cover is Skylab's nephew, as he would state in a later interview with Jô Soares.

The album can be downloaded for free on Skylab's official website. The digital download version comes with the bonus tracks "Câncer no Cu" and "Chico Xavier & Roberto Carlos"; Skylab himself, "in an example of 'self-censorship'", omitted them from the original physical release for considering them too controversial, even for his standards.

A live recording of "Música para Paralítico" appeared on Skylab's 2009 live album Skylab IX under the alternate title "Porrada na Cabeça". The reasons for the title change are unknown.

Critical reception
Website La Cumbuca included Skylab IV in 42nd place in its list of the Top 200 Brazilian Albums of the 2000s. Skylab II, V and VII were also featured on the list, in 24th, 71st and 110th place, respectively.

Track listing

Personnel
 Rogério Skylab – vocals, production
 Thiago Amorim – electric guitar
 Rodrigo Saci – bass guitar
 Bruno Vieira – drums
 Alexandre Guichard – classical guitar
 Luiz Tornaghi – mastering
 Solange Venturi – photography
 Luísa Bousada – cover art

References

2003 albums
Rogério Skylab albums
Self-released albums
Sequel albums
Obscenity controversies in music
Albums free for download by copyright owner